Richard 'Roo' Molloy is the younger brother of Mick Molloy and was the co-host of Tough Love with Mick Molloy radio show on Triple M.

Molloy also co-wrote the Australian films Crackerjack and BoyTown with his brother.

References

Australian radio personalities
Living people
Year of birth missing (living people)